George Thornton (23 December 1819 – 23 November 1901) was an Australian merchant and politician, serving as a Sydney Municipal Council Alderman, Mayor of Sydney and member of the New South Wales Legislative Assembly and Legislative Council.

Thornton was born in Sydney, the son of Samuel Thornton (son of another Samuel, a woollen manufacturer of Barnsley, Yorkshire) and Sarah (née Madden). Sarah was transported to Australia as a punishment for larceny; Samuel followed, arriving in Sydney in 1814 as a free settler, and was granted land by the colonial government.

George Thornton was educated at the Australian College on Jamieson Street, Sydney; he went into work as a custom-house and ship agent, later becoming an import merchant. Having been a magistrate in Sydney for many years, Thornton served also as a director of various financial institutions such as the City Bank Of Sydney. He was elected to the Sydney Municipal Council in November 1847, and served as mayor in 1853 and 1857. Thornton was elected as a member for Sydney City from 1858 to 1859.  In May 1861 he was appointed to the Legislative Council when Governor Young agreed to flood the council in support of John Robertson's land bills, but this was frustrated when the President of the Council, Sir William Burton refused to swear in the new members and resigned with others forcing the proproguement of the Council. He represented Goldfields West in 1867 and 1868. In 1877 he was appointed for life to the Council and was served as the Secretary for Mines and the Representative of Government for a month in 1885.

Thornton was the foundation President of the Sydney Rowing Club and was instrumental in the club's formation and growth from 1870 until his death. He served as President of the New South Wales Rowing Association from 1879 till his death.

Thornton died of dysentery in 1901 at Parramatta, survived by his wife, Mary Ann (daughter of John Solomon, of Sydney) and daughter Frances; he was predeceased by a son and a daughter.

References

 

Mayors and Lord Mayors of Sydney
Members of the New South Wales Legislative Assembly
Members of the New South Wales Legislative Council
1819 births
1901 deaths
19th-century Australian politicians
Mayors of Woollahra